Grabtown Gulch is a valley in San Mateo County, California. It contains a stream which is a tributary of Purisima Creek.

Background
Grabtown Gulch (Purissima Redwoods OSP): Gulch below the site of the trading center and lumber camp of Grabtown on Tunitas Road, originally called Gilbert's Camp in the 1880s. The origin of the name is attributed to the tendency of its inhabitants to lay claim to land and/or anything of value that wasn't nailed down.

References

See also
List of watercourses in the San Francisco Bay Area

Valleys of San Mateo County, California
Landforms of the San Francisco Bay Area
Valleys of California